The Basutoland Congress Party is a pan-Africanist and left-wing political party in Lesotho.

The Basutoland African Congress (BAC) was founded in 1952 by Ntsu Mokhehle and Potlako Leballo. The party was renamed the Basutoland Congress Party (BCP) in 1957 and retained this name after independence in 1966, stating that Lesotho was not truly independent. Leballo left the party in 1959 to form the Pan Africanist Congress of South Africa (PAC).

The BCP lost the 1965 election but won in 1970. It was denied power by a coup d'état in support of the defeated prime minister Leabua Jonathan.

In 1974, following an unsuccessful rising, the BCP sent 178 men for military training by the PAC in Gaddafi's Libya. In 1979 they began a guerrilla war as the Lesotho Liberation Army (LLA).

The party won a landslide victory at the 1993 general election, and its leader Ntsu Mokhehle became prime minister. Mokhehle left the party in 1997 with his faction to form the Lesotho Congress for Democracy. The BCP was led by Tseliso Makhakhe, Qhobela Molapo, Ntsukunyane Mphanya and (currently) Thulo Mahlakeng.

At the 25 May 2002 general election, the party won 2.6% of the vote and 3 out of 120 seats.

Election results

References

1952 establishments in Basutoland
African socialist political parties
Basutoland
Political parties established in 1952
Pan-Africanism in Lesotho
Pan-Africanist political parties in Africa
Political parties in Lesotho
Socialism in Lesotho
Socialist parties in Africa